Vizcarrondo is a surname. Notable people with the surname include:

Augusto Valentín Vizcarrondo, Puerto Rican politician
Carlos Vizcarrondo (born 1955), Puerto Rican judge and politician
Julio Vizcarrondo (1829–1889), Puerto Rican abolitionist, journalist and politician
Maria Vizcarrondo-De Soto (born  1951), Puerto Rican businessperson
Oswaldo Vizcarrondo (born 1984), Venezuelan footballer